The Cemetery of Our Saviour is a cemetery in Oslo, Norway, located north of Hammersborg in Gamle Aker district. It is located adjacent to the older Old Aker Cemetery and was created in 1808 as a result of the great famine and cholera epidemic of the Napoleonic Wars. Its grounds were extended in 1911. The cemetery has been full and thus closed for new graves since 1952, with interment only being allowed in existing family graves. The cemetery includes five sections, including Æreslunden, Norway's main honorary burial ground, and the western, southern, eastern and northern sections. The Cemetery of Our Saviour became the preferred cemetery of bourgeois and other upper-class families. It has many grand tombstones and is the most famous cemetery in Norway.

Notable interments

 Ari Behn, writer
 Eivind Astrup, Arctic explorer
 Johan Diederich Behrens, singing teacher and choral conductor
 Christian Birch-Reichenwald, politician
 Bjørnstjerne Bjørnson, writer
 Peder Bjørnson, priest and father of Bjørnstjerne Bjørnson
 Otto Albert Blehr, Prime Minister of Norway
 Carsten Borchgrevink, Anglo-Norwegian polar explorer and leader of the Southern Cross Expedition
 Jens Bratlie, politician
 Anne Brown, soprano singer and actress
 Olaf Bull, poet
 Camilla Collett, writer
 Niels Christian Ditleff, diplomat
 Frederik Due, military officer and statesman
 Birger Eriksen, army officer
 Edward Evans, Royal Navy officer and member of the Terra Nova Expedition
 Thomas Fearnley, painter
 Carl Gustav Fleischer, general
 Hans Gude, painter
 Francis Hagerup, professor, diplomat and politician
 C. J. Hambro, journalist, author and politician
 Aasta Hansteen, painter and early feminist
 Viggo Hansteen, lawyer
 Knut Haukelid, World War II commando
 Henrik Ibsen, playwright
 Lillebil Ibsen, dancer and actress
 Tancred Ibsen, director, screenwriter, World War I pilot
 Gina Krog, suffragist and activist
 Christian Krohg, artist and author

 Bjørg Lødøen, painter
 Sophus Lie, mathematician
 Jorgen Gunnarsson Lovland, Prime Minister of Norway
 Agnes Mowinckel, actress and theatre director
 Edvard Munch, painter
 Rikard Nordraak, composer
 Harald Nørregaard, lawyer, art collector and Chairman of the Norwegian Bar Association
 Sigurd Odland, theologian
 Ole Olsen, musician
 Christopher Tostrup Paus, count, papal chamberlain and philanthropist
 Bernhard Pauss, theologian and educator
 Henriette Pauss, teacher, editor, humanitarian and missionary leader
 Alf Prøysen, writer and musician
 Marcus Gjøe Rosenkrantz, government minister
 Hedevig Rosing , author, educator, school founder; first woman to teach in Copenhagen's public schools
 Evald Rygh, banker and politician
 Kirsten Sand, architect
 Christian Homann Schweigaard, lawyer and politician
 Christian August Selmer, politician
 Michael Skjelderup, first Professor of Medicine at the University of Christiania
 Emil Stang, jurist and politician
 Frederik Stang, lawyer, public servant, and politician
 Johannes Steen, politician
 Johan Sverdrup, liberal politician and first Prime Minister of Norway
 Jan Peter Syse, Prime Minister of Norway
 Marcus Thrane, author, journalist, and the leader of the first labour movement in Norway
 Oscar Torp, politician
 Grete Waitz, world champion marathon runner
 Henrik Wergeland, writer
 Rolf Wickstrøm, labour activist
 Gisken Wildenvey, writer

Gallery

References

External links
 Vår Frelsers gravlund
 

 
Cemeteries in Norway
Buildings and structures in Oslo
1808 establishments in Norway
Cemeteries in Oslo